Hegelian Dialectic (The Book of Revelation) is the fifth studio album by American rapper Prodigy. The album was released on January 20, 2017 through Prodigy's Infamous Records. The first single from the album was "Tyranny", which was released in February 2016.

Background
Production for the album came from Beat Butcha, Budgie Beats, Jordan Reid, Knxwledge, The Alchemist among others. Ca$h Bilz was the only featured guest appearance on the album. Hegelian Dialectic was recorded and mixed by Joe the Engine Ear. It was the last album to be released during his lifetime prior to his death in June 2017, which was caused by accidental asphyxiation. The album was intended to be the first in a series of three albums he planned to release over the course of several months, with the two sequels entitled The Book of Heroine and The Book of the Dead.

The album is named after the philosophical concept Hegelian dialectic. It is an argument process explaining the progress of history as being the conflict of ideas, where the interactions between thesis and anti-thesis create synthesis. This idea is the logical foundation stone for Karl Marx and Friedrich Engels' theory of history as the history of class struggle where the conditions of societal production develop until the oppressed classes necessarily overthrow the oppressor class.

Critical reception
Hegelian Dialectic received generally positive reviews, with critics praising the new politically driven and socially conscious tone, a notable change from Prodigy's previous work. Adam Seyum of Music Connection gave the album eight out of ten stars, saying "With songs like 'Mystic', 'Tyranny' and 'Spiritual War,' [Prodigy] encourages listeners to open up their third eye and observe 'the system' meticulously."

Track listing

References

2017 albums
Prodigy (rapper) albums
Albums produced by Knxwledge
Albums produced by the Alchemist (musician)
Albums produced by Beat Butcha